SPE may refer to:

Science and technology
 A monomer used to make polysulfobetaines, or occasionally the resulting polymer itself
 Serum protein electrophoresis
 Solar particle event,generating very high energy protons
 Solid phase extraction, from a mixture
 Solid-phase epitaxy, from amorphous to crystalline
 The Sound Pattern of English, a 1968 book by Noam Chomsky and Morris Halle
 SpE, abbreviation for Sporadic E propagation
 Spe (planet), 14 Andromedae b
 Stanford prison experiment, in psychology
 Synchronous payload envelope, in synchronous optical networking

Computer science
 Synergistic Processing Element in the Cell microprocessor
 Signal-Processing Engine, for example in the PowerPC e500
 Single-Pair Ethernet

Organizations
 Sauber Petronas Engineering, car engine manufacturer
 Societas Privata Europaea, a Europe-wide type of limited company
 Sony Pictures Entertainment, a US company
 SPE, later Luminus (company)
 Special Police Establishment, later Central Bureau of Investigation, India
 Special purpose entity, for a specific purpose

Professional societies
 Society for Photographic Education
 Society of Petroleum Engineers
 SPE Certified Petroleum Professional, a designation
 Society of Plastics Engineers
 Society of Professional Engineers UK

Other
 US supervisory patent examiner
 SPE Certified, a food standard
 Société Parisienne d'Édition (S.P.É.), a French publisher

See also
 Spes (disambiguation)